Starpoint Gemini 3 is a space combat and role-playing video game developed by LGM Games, currently in early access mode and set for full release later in 2019. The game is the third installment in the Starpoint Gemini series and a direct successor to Starpoint Gemini 2. Unlike the previous installments, the game focuses on story-driven elements and aerial dogfights (which will introduce full-body NPC characters to interact with for the first time), cockpit view and modular upgrades of the ship. The story is written by Darko Macan. The game utilizes LGM's proprietary WhaleX game engine.

Gameplay
The game is described as an open world, single player RPG, in which the player takes the role of Jonathan Bold, a space adventurer travelling the Gemini system. It will add two new planetary systems, apart from the existing Gemini and introduce interiors for the first time. The interiors will include bars, industrial halls and night clubs. The player's ship will be accompanied by ADAH, a digital consciousness which controls the ship's computer hardware. The player will also use a drone for exploration purposes in otherwise inaccessible areas.

Development
The game is set to be the developers' most ambitious project to date, seeking to push the boundaries both in terms of market success and quality. The game is developed by a core team of 15 people, with additional 5 external collaborators. The developer will launch a development diary detailing the production and the development of the game.

Reception
The game entered Steam's Early Access programme on 5 September 2019. Andrew Farrell of PCInvasion remarked that "Starpoint Gemini 3 is fun, though. The graphics and gameplay are solid, and the cutscenes and characters are funny and entertaining for what they are."

Music
The music of Starpoint Gemini was composed by Nikola Nikita Jeremić. Video game music label Materia Collective released the soundtrack on 25 February 2020.

References

External links
Official website
Steam Store page

2019 video games
Windows games
Space trading and combat simulators
Video games developed in Croatia
Space opera video games
Science fiction video games
Video games with Steam Workshop support
Video game sequels
Single-player video games